Jack Hall may refer to:

Sports

Jack Hall (footballer, born 1883) (1883–1949), English football forward for Stoke, Brighton & Hove Albion, Middlesbrough, Leicester Fosse and Birmingham
Jack Hall (footballer, born 1885) (1885–?), English-born football manager active in the Netherlands
Jack Hall (footballer, born 1890) (1890–?), English-born football fullback for Barnsley, Manchester City and Bristol Rovers
Jack Hall (footballer, born 1902), played for Heywood St James, Rochdale, Great Harwood, Rossendale Utd and Bacup Borough between 1922 and 1934
Jack Hall (footballer, born 1905) (1905–?), English-born football forward for Lincoln City, Accrington Stanley and Manchester United
Jack Hall (footballer, born 1912) (1912–2000), English football goalkeeper for Manchester United and Tottenham Hotspur

Others
Jack Hall (architect) (1913–2003), American architect working in the modernist style
Jack Hall (trade unionist) (1915-1971), American trade unionist in Hawaii
Jack Hall (politician) (1910–1970), Australian state politician in Western Australia
Mad Jack Hall (1672–1716), Jacobite-leader and property owner, tried for treason
Jack Hall (song), British folksong

See also
John Hall (disambiguation)

Hall, Jack